Spencer Road may refer to:

 Spencer Road Halt railway station, Croydon, London 
 Spencer Road Wetlands, a nature reserve in Mitcham, London